Anita Thapar  is a Welsh child psychiatrist who is Professor of Child and Adolescent Psychiatry in the Institute of Psychological Medicine and Clinical Neuroscience at Cardiff University. Her research focuses on risk factors for ADHD and major depression in children. She was elected a fellow of the Royal College of Psychiatrists in 1995, and of the Academy of Medical Sciences and Learned Society of Wales in 2011. In 2017, she received the Frances Hoggan Medal from the Learned Society of Wales and was named a Commander of the Order of the British Empire (CBE), both in recognition of her research in child and adolescent psychiatry.

Education and research
Thapar was born in South Wales and educated at the Welsh National School of Medicine in Cardiff, where she received her MBBCh in 1985. She then worked at district general hospitals in Carmarthen and Swansea to complete her clinical training. She received her Ph.D. from the University of Wales College of Medicine in 1995. She then worked as a senior lecturer at Manchester University before being appointed Professor of Child and Adolescent Psychiatry at Cardiff University in 1999, making her the first such professor in Wales. Thapar is currently researching ADHD, autism and genetics.

Biography 
She is married to a former general practitioner and has two adult sons.

Honours and awards 

 UK Professor of Psychiatry Club:  Academic Women in Psychiatry Award (joint) for enhancing the careers of academic women in psychiatry, 2017
 Learned Society of Wales: Frances Hoggan Medal for outstanding research by women in Science, Technology, Engineering, Medicine or Mathematics, 2017
 Queen's New Year Honours: CBE for services to Child and Adolescent Psychiatry, 2017
 President's Medal 2015, Royal College of Psychiatrists, UK  for contribution to policy, public knowledge, education and meeting population and patient care needs, 2015
 Ruane Prize 2015, Brain and Behavior Research Foundation, USA for outstanding Child & Adolescent Psychiatric research, 2015
 Elected Fellow of the Academy of Medical Sciences (FMedSci), 2011
 Elected Fellow of the Learned Society of Wales, 2011
 Elected Fellow of the Royal College of Psychiatrists, 1995
 Laughlin Prize 1989 Royal College of Psychiatrists, UK for  highest marks and best recommendation in MRCPsych examinations, 1989
 Maldwyn Catell Memorial Prize (Welsh Medical Council), Welsh National School of Medicine, 1985
 Geraint Walters Prize in Haematology, Welsh National School of Medicine, 1985

References

External links
Faculty page

Living people
Welsh psychiatrists
Alumni of Cardiff University
Child psychiatrists
Attention deficit hyperactivity disorder researchers
Academics of Cardiff University
Commanders of the Order of the British Empire
Fellows of the Royal College of Psychiatrists
British women psychiatrists
Welsh women scientists
Fellows of the Academy of Medical Sciences (United Kingdom)
Fellows of the Learned Society of Wales
Academics of the University of Manchester
Year of birth missing (living people)